Kahama Urban District is one of the five districts of the Shinyanga Region of Tanzania. Its administrative centre is the town of Kahama. It is bordered to the north and south by Kahama Rural District, to the east by Nzega District and to the west by Bukombe District.

According to the 2012 Tanzania National Census, the population of the Kahama Urban District was 242,208.

In 2021 President Magufuli promoted Kahama from a town council to a municipal council.

Economy
Kahama is now an urban area, declared and publicly known. Its recent development, which are also fascinating, are the result of Isaka dry port and mining activities which have been going on for quite some time now. The town of Kahama now is enjoying the employment from Barrick Gold in the newly operating site of Buzwagi Gold Mine situated in between Kahama and Mwendakulima along Isaka road.

Also manufacturing activities are now part of the town which is already connected to new project of water from Lake Victoria which for decades was one of the problems the people of Kahama were facing. It has now grown to the extent it is connected with Nyihogo, Malunga, Shunu, nyahanga, Igomero nyakato, mbulu, Bukondamoyo, mhungulamwime, which made the urbanized area to grow also.

Transport

Road

Paved Trunk road T3 from Morogoro to the Rwanda border passes through Kahama Urban District from east to west.

Wards
As of 2012, Kahama Urban District was administratively divided into 12 wards.

 Busoka
 Isagehe
 Iyenze
 Kagongwa
 Kahama Mjini
 Kilago
 Kinaga
 Majengo
 Malunga
 Mhongolo
 Mhungula
 Mondo
 Mwendakulima
 Ngogwa
 Nyahanga
 Nyandekwa
 Nyasubi
 Nyihogo
 Wendele
 Zongomera

References

Districts of Shinyanga Region